"Wine Me Up" is a song first recorded by American country music artist Faron Young. It was released in May 1969 as the first single from his album, Wine Me Up. The song peaked at number 2 on the Billboard Hot Country Singles chart and reached number 3 on the RPM Country Tracks chart in Canada.  

The authorship of the song has been a source of confusion.  Various combinations of Faron Young, Eddie Crandell and Billy Deaton have been credited on the many different artist releases of the song over the years.  To paraphrase Faron Young and Frank Oakley, on P. 120-121 of his 2007 biography, "Live Fast, Love Hard: The Faron Young Story" by Diane Diekman, Carl Belew and Van Givens wrote "Wine Me Up".  They were working for 4 Star Records at the time and without permission, Belew and Givens sold the song rights to Faron Young and Frank Oakley under the premise that their wives had written the song.  At the same time, Belew also sold the song rights to a man named Eddie Crandell.  Faron's original single listed his name and Crandell's as the "songwriters".  Once the song hit the charts 4 Star sued Faron and Oakley (and presumably Crandell).  Faron and Oakley eventually ceded the publishing rights back to 4 Star, but retained ownership of the song (75% Faron/25% Oakley). At a later date Oakley sold his interest in the song to Faron's new manager, Billy Deaton.

Chart performance

Larry Boone version

"Wine Me Up" was covered by American country music artist Larry Boone on his album Swingin' Doors, Sawdust Floors. It was released in February 1989 as the album's second single. Boone's version peaked at number 19 on the Billboard Hot Country Singles chart and reached number 36 on the RPM Country Tracks chart in Canada.

Chart performance

Other versions
Ernest Tubb covered the song on his 1970 album Good Year for the Wine.
Gary Allan covered the song on his 1996 album Used Heart for Sale.
Tanya Tucker covered the song on her 2009 album My Turn.
Lorrie Morgan covered the song on her 2009 album A Moment in Time.
Mel Street covered the song on his 1975 album Smokey mountain memories.
Jerry Wallace covered the song on his 1972 album To get to you.

References

1969 singles
1989 singles
Faron Young songs
Larry Boone songs
Mercury Records singles
Song recordings produced by Jerry Kennedy
Song recordings produced by Ray Baker (music producer)
1969 songs